Giant Sable may refer to:

Giant sable antelope, a subgenus of antelope
Giant Sable rabbit, a breed of rabbit